The Isle of Man Fire and Rescue Service is the fire brigade of the Isle of Man Government, providing fire and rescue cover throughout the Isle of Man, an independent Crown dependency located in the Irish Sea between England and Ireland. The service operates under the Department of Home Affairs.

History
The Isle of Man received its first two fire engines from England in October 1803. These were independently operated by an insurance company, and were horse-drawn and hand-operated. In the late nineteenth century, legislation was introduced permitting town commissioners to establish local fire brigades. The Peel commissioners did so in 1884, followed by Port Erin in 1903 and Laxey in 1920. Some larger settlements, such as Ramsey and Douglas, had entered into local arrangements with the military or with the privately owned insurance company fire brigades, for local fire cover. The outbreak of war brought calls for a unified fire brigade. In February 1940, the Local Government (Fires) Act was implemented, establishing a single Isle of Man Fire Brigade, with seven fire areas - Douglas, Laxey, Ramsey, Kirk Michael, Peel, Port Erin and Castletown. These fire areas are the same today.

Structure and ranks
The island's seven fire stations are located at Douglas (station 1), Laxey (station 2), Ramsey (station 3), Kirk Michael (station 4), Peel (station 5), Port Erin (Rushen) (station 6), and Castletown (station 7), matching the 'fire areas' originally specified in the Local Government (Fires) Act of February 1940. (See airport fire service, below, for station 9). A total of 110 retained (part-time) firefighters are stationed across all seven fire stations; additionally Douglas fire station has a permanent watch of full-time firefighters, numbering 32 in total, working in shifts. The service is headed by a Chief Fire Officer (Kevin Groom, appointed 2013), and has a rank structure based on that of the United Kingdom.

Fire stations and appliances
The service has seven fire stations. The largest, at Douglas, is crewed by both wholetime firefighters and retained firefighters, whilst the other six stations at Laxey, Ramsey, Kirk Michael, Peel, Port Erin, and Castletown, are staffed by retained crews only. Retained firefighters make up around two thirds of the total complement of just over 150 firefighters.

Ronaldsway Airport Fire and Rescue Service
In common with most international airports, the Isle of Man Airport, historically known as Ronaldsway Airport, maintains its own independent fire service. This service cooperates closely with the Isle of Man Fire and Rescue Service. The airport fire station is now considered too small for its current appliances and crews, and a contract has been awarded for the construction of a new £200,000 fire station, starting in 2022-2023.

Emergency services on the Isle of Man
Isle of Man Ambulance Service
Isle of Man Civil Defence Corps
Isle of Man Coastguard
Isle of Man Constabulary (Police)

References

External links
 

Emergency services in the Isle of Man
1940 establishments in the Isle of Man